Sweet oil may refer to:

 Another name for olive oil
 Sweet crude oil, a type of petroleum
 Mild vegetable oil used for food